Hellinsia ossipellis is a moth of the family Pterophoridae that is endemic to Dominican Republic.

Adults are on wing in May.

References

ossipellis
Moths described in 1897
Endemic fauna of the Dominican Republic
Moths of the Caribbean